Vinces Canton is a canton of Ecuador, located in the  Los Ríos Province.  Its capital is the town of Vinces.  Its population at the 2001 census was 61,565.

Demographics
Ethnic groups as of the Ecuadorian census of 2010:
Montubio  46.6%
Mestizo  42.9%
Afro-Ecuadorian  5.6%
White  4.2%
Indigenous  0.4%
Other  0.2%

References

Cantons of Los Ríos Province